Hawks & Doves is the tenth studio album by Canadian folk rock musician Neil Young, released in October 1980.

Overview
Hawks & Doves'''s two sides were recorded in different circumstances, side one being culled from sessions dating from approximately 1974 through 1977, and side two from sessions set in early 1980 specifically for the album. It is also one of Young's shortest albums, its running time just under half an hour.

Conception
Side one includes "Little Wing" and "The Old Homestead", which were originally recorded during the sessions for 1975's Homegrown. "Lost in Space" was a Comes a Time outtake and "Captain Kennedy" was recorded the night of the Hitchhiker recording in 1976.

Side two consists of the recordings intended for the album, being the straightest country and western songs Young had penned to date, even more so than those found on American Stars 'N Bars or Comes a Time.

ReleaseRecord World said the title track has "straycat guitar leads, cranky fiddle colors and smart chorus fills."

It was unavailable on compact disc until it was released as a HDCD-encoded remastered version on August 19, 2003 as part of the Neil Young Archives Digital Masterpiece Series''.

Track listing
All tracks are written by Neil Young.

Personnel
 Neil Young – guitar, harmonica, piano, vocals
 Greg Thomas – drums
 Dennis Belfield – bass
 Ben Keith – steel and Dobro, harmony vocals
 Rufus Thibodeaux – fiddle
 Ann Hillary O'Brien – harmony vocals
 Levon Helm – drums on "The Old Homestead"
 Tim Drummond – bass on "The Old Homestead"
 Tom Scribner – saw player on "The Old Homestead"

Studios
Quadrafonic Sound Studio, Nashville, Tennessee
Village Recorders, Los Angeles, California
Indigo Ranch Recording Studio, Malibu, California
Triad Recording Studio, Ft. Lauderdale, Florida
Gold Star Recording Studio, Hollywood, California

Charts

References

External links
 Lyrics at HyperRust.org

Neil Young albums
1980 albums
Reprise Records albums
Warner Records albums
Albums produced by Neil Young
Albums produced by Elliot Mazer
Albums recorded at Gold Star Studios